Dack or variation, may refer to:

People

Surname
 Bradley Dack (born 1993), UK soccer player
 Craig Dack, Australian motorcycle champion
 Gail Monroe Dack (1901–1976), U.S. bacteriologist
 Harry Dack (1877–1954), UK politician
 Jimmy Dack (born 1972), UK soccer player and coach
 Vu Duc Minh Dack (born 1982), French karateka martial artist
 Walter MacMorris Dack (1852–1912), Canadian newspaper publisher

Given name
 Dack Rambo (1941–1994), U.S. actor

Other uses
 A character from Gunsmoke
 Charlton and Dack, a municipality in Timiskaming, Ontario, Canada, formed in part from Dack Township
 to dack, to pants; see pantsing

See also

 Dacks, or sweatpants
 
 DAQ (disambiguation)
 DAC (disambiguation)
 DAK (disambiguation)